The Ọwọrọ ethnic nationality represents a group of people around the Niger-Benue confluence speaking a Yoruba dialect called Oworo. They are generally classified as part of Northeast Yoruba (NEY) of the Yoruba people.

Origin

The origin of the Oworo people by oral tradition is linked to three brothers who left Ile-Ife to hunt around the present day Oworo Land. The successful adventure caused them to name the place 'owo mi ro' which means 'my hands are full of blessings'. Another Legend called Ako meaning "meeting", says that people came from several locations to converge on the present day Oworo land. This legend accommodates the group (clans) of Oworo that claim not to be of Yoruba descent
Ade Obayemi however opined that Okun people, the Northeast Yoruba people including Abinu (Bunu), Owe, Ijumu, Ikiri, Iyagba and Oworo located in Kogi State did not migrate from Ile-Ife but are aboriginals in the Niger-Benue Confluence.

Europeans, like Temple O., who made early contact and wrote about the Oworo people referred to them in their writings as 'Aworo'.

Traditional Institutions
The Oworos live in several small towns ruled by various kings. Some include: 
 The Olu of Oworo
 The Olu Apata of Apata

Language

Oworo people speak a dialect of Yoruba, linguistically similar to other Okun dialects. Virtually all Oworos can fluently communicate in Yoruba. They can as well converse to a great extent with speakers of other Okun dialects since the languages are mutually intelligible. In addition to speaking Oworo, those in the eastern axis can also speak Igbira Igu (Egbura).

Geography 
Oworo land is located on western bank of River Niger by the Niger-Benue Confluence and bounded to the north by Igbira Igu (Egbura), northwest by Kakanda, west by the Abinu and to the south by Ebira land. It is a mountainous terrain. A number of Oworo communities are on the Agbaja Plateau. Some Oworo towns and Villages includes Agbaja, Jamata, Obajana, Tajimi, Emu, Jakura, Omuwa, Otada, Agbodo, Adamogu, Otuga, Gbonla-Odo, Aleke, Igaa, Ojigi, Owara Igaachi, Igbonla, Ogbabon, Gbande, Adogbe, Ijiho, Karara, Banda, Okonoke, Akpata, Oyo, Irimi, Gbaude, Iwaa, Osokosoko, Okomoba, Ogbongboro, and Felele (The northern suburb of Lokoja town).

Culture and Political Structure
Oworo culture bears grave resemblance with those of Bunu, Ikiri, Yagba, Ijumu and Owe people who are together with the Oworo people referred to as Okun, the word used in greeting. Like the Bunu people, Oworo people were known for their bassa-like cat whisker marks. The women were known for weaving of a cloth called Arigidi, a cotton textile, and also weaved abata (aso ipo), a red textile used by Oworo, Owe and Bunu for the burial rights of important people.
The men are traditionally hunters and farmer. Fishing is also practiced in the riverine communities of the eastern axis of Oworo land. The people practice Christianity, Islam and African traditional religion. Prominent among Oworo festivals is the Oluwo festival. It is a triennial festival of the worship of Olu-iho (the king of all holes) which is the Agbaja end of a 2km long natural tunnel. The advent of Christianity and Islam has reduced the importance and worship of several gods (ebora) and as well lessened the importance and observation of several egun or egungun festivals which have their roots in the worship of ancestral spirits.

Historically, Oworo was organised into cities states, with each state having her own leader. However, with the advent of Nupe hegemony, the central kingship system began in the 19th century, the first Olu being Olu Okpoto. The current Olu of Oworo is Alhaji Mohammed Baiyerohi.

Mineral resources
Oworo Land is rich in mineral deposits. The major minerals include iron ore on the Agbaja Plateau, Marbles in Jakura and Limestone in Oyo-Iwa Community.Dangote Group is currently exploring the limestone in Oyo-Iwa axis of Oworo land in the production of cement in it Dangote Cement factory located at Obajana.

References

Oyelaran O.O (1978), "Lingusitic Speculations on Yoruba History", in his
DEPARTMENT OF AFRICAN LANGUAGES AND LITERATURES, UNIVERSITY OF IFE
SEMINAR SERIES 1:624-651. Ife-Department of African Languages and
Literatures, University of Ife, Nigeria.

Bernhard Struck (1911)"Linguistic Bibliography of Northern Nigeria: Including Hausa and Fula, with Notes on the Yoruba Dialects" Journal of the Royal African Society.Vol. 11, No. 41 (October 1911), pp. 47–61. Published by: Oxford University Press on behalf of Royal African Society.
Bakinde C.O.(2013) "Oral Narrations on the Origin and Settlement Patterns of Okun People of Central Nigeria". Journal of tourism and Heritage Studies. Vol 2 No.2
Printed by THE ARGUS PRINTING cK: PUBLISHING COMPANY, LIMITED. CAPE TOWN

Yoruba subgroups